Fallis is a surname. Notable people with the surname include:

Abigail Fallis (born 1968), British sculptor
E.O. Fallis, American architect
Edwina Hume Fallis (1876–1957), American educator
Ian Fallis (1954–1977), Scottish football player
Iva Campbell Fallis (1883–1956), Canadian politician
Jacque Batt (died 2014), born Jacque Fallis
James Robinson Fallis (1871–1935), Canadian politician
Mary Lou Fallis (born 1948), Canadian opera singer
William Armstrong Fallis (1832–1903), Canadian politician
[[Jay Fallis] (born 1990), Canadian politician.